Palmer Creek is a stream in the U.S. state of Oregon. It is a tributary to the Applegate River.

Palmer Creek was named in honor of a local gold miner.

References

Rivers of Oregon
Rivers of Jackson County, Oregon